Indara is a village in Bakshi Ka Talab block of Lucknow district, Uttar Pradesh, India. As of 2011, its population is 2,136, in 385 households. It is the seat of a gram panchayat, which also includes the village of Khajuri.

References 

Villages in Lucknow district